Milo Nqoro (born 16 December 1988) is a South African rugby union player.

In 2010, he moved back to the  where he made his professional debut.

He also played for the South Africa sevens team in 2008.

References

South African rugby union players
Living people
1988 births
South Africa international rugby sevens players
Eastern Province Elephants players
Rugby union wings
Rugby union players from the Eastern Cape